Tret may refer to:

Places
 Tret, Murree, Pakistan
 Tret, a subdivision of Fondo, Italy

Other uses
 Trett, or tret, an archaic allowance from the gross weight of goods
 Alpha,alpha-trehalose synthase, or TreT, an enzyme

See also
 Trets,  Provence-Alpes-Côtes d’Azur, France